The Unholy Handjob is the second studio album by DUH, released in 1995 by Alternative Tentacles.

Music
Because of the less than serious nature of the project, the music of The Unholy Handjob is based around simplified riffs and notably more alternative metal-based than its predecessor, which was firmly rooted in noisy garage rock and sludge metal. The track "Pricks Are Heavy" is a live performance of the band opening for L7 at Whisky a Go Go. The track's title is a pun of Bricks Are Heavy by L7, comprises a tongue-in-cheek and haphazardly performed medley of "Heart-Shaped Box" by Nirvana, "Basket Case" by Green Day and "Shitlist" by L7 in-between vocalist Greg Werckman aggressively taunting the crowd.

Reception 

Ned Raggett, who had written a positive review of the band's debut, was critical of The Unholy Handjob. He gave the album two-and-a-half out of five stars, saying "the vocalist (clearly not Biafra, that much is clear) aims for yelled pseudo-metal smoothness, if such a thing exists, and the riffs and songs are as rockingly clichéd as they get. If Butt Trumpet, say, had done this kind of thing, nobody would have noticed much about it, and if it had been marketed as a direct parody, doubtless little would have cared."

Track listing

Personnel
Adapted from The Unholy Handjob liner notes.
DUH
 Chris Dodge – drums, oboe, bass guitar, backing vocals
 Dustin Donaldson (as Shitty Bicker) – percussion
 Sean Kelly (as S.K.) – bass guitar
 Dean Menta – electric guitar, backing vocals, production
 Greg Werckman (as Grig Cashmoney) – vocals
Production and additional personnel
 Paul Barker – production
 Harvey Bennett Stafford – cover art, illustrations
 George Horn – mastering
 Candace Workman – photography
 John Yates – photography

Release history

References

External links 
 

1995 albums
DUH (band) albums
Alternative Tentacles albums